Crockford's, the popular name for William Crockford's St James's Club was a London gentlemen's club, now dissolved. It was established in 1823, closed in 1845, re-founded in 1928 and closed in 1970. One of London's older clubs, it was centred on gambling and maintained a somewhat raffish and raucous reputation. It was founded by William Crockford who employed Benjamin Wyatt and Philip Wyatt to construct the city's most opulent palace of gentlemanly pleasure, which opened in November 1827. and he employed two of London's finest chefs of the time, Louis Eustache Ude and then Charles Elmé Francatelli to feed its members, food and drink being supplied free after midnight.

From 1823, the club leased 50 St. James's Street, and then nos. 51–53, which enabled Crockford to pull down all four houses and build his palatial club on the site.  After the club's closure, this continued to be used as a clubhouse, at first briefly by the short-lived Military, Naval and County Service Club, and then between 1874 and 1976 it was home to the Devonshire Club.

The current Crockfords, though using much of the "Crocky" imagery and high-end reputation, has no connection with the original club and operates from an entirely different building at nearby 30 Curzon Street.

Founder
William Crockford was born on 13 January 1776, the son of William and Mary Ann Crockford, and was baptised at St Clement Danes in London on 12 February 1776. He began life working in his father's fish shop adjoining Temple Bar (at the original site of that landmark gate – now to be found aside St Paul's Cathedral). His ability at calculation was to stand him in good stead: he quickly took to gambling, and after a number of long sessions amassed a tidy sum – enough to launch himself into Regency clubland. He acquired a site in St James's Street and opened a building that was to become the most famous gaming house in Europe: "Crockford's". He catered to the aristocracy, took a charge on every bet laid, and in the process amassed a fortune estimated at the time of his 'retirement' in 1840 to have been £1,200,000 in the currency of the time, certainly enough to establish homes at 11 Carlton House Terrace at which he died (later to become Prime Minister William Gladstone's home) and at Panton House, Newmarket. Although he had technically retired in 1840, leaving the running of the Club to a Management Committee, he still owned the lease, which was sold after his death for £2,900, with twenty-two years still to run at a yearly rent of £1,400.

He married first Mary Lockwood in 1801 and then Sarah Frances Douglas on 20 May 1812 in St George's, Hanover Square; he fathered 14 children and died on 24 May 1844. He lies buried in a family vault underneath the Chapel of Kensal Green Cemetery, London.

Refounding

In 1928, the club was refounded primarily as a bridge club patronised by British players including world champion Terence Reese and Kenneth Konstam. Subsequently, chemin-de-fer, roulette and blackjack were added, reverting the club to its gambling traditions.

See also
List of gentlemen's clubs in London
William Crockford
Colin Smythe, 'Charles Elmé Francatelli, Crockford's and the Royal Connection'. http://colinsmythe.co.uk/charles-elme-francatelli-crockfords-and-the-royal-connection/

References

Notes

Bibliography
Henry Turner Waddy, The Devonshire Club and Crockford's (E. Nash, 1919) Full text out of copyright and available at archive.org
Frank Siltzer, "Newmarket its Sport and Personalities" (Cassell & Co 1923)
Rupert Mackeson, Bet like a Man (Eye Ltd 2001)
Harold P. Clunn, The face of London (Spring Books)
John Raymond, The Reminiscences of Captain Gronow being anecdotes of the camp court, clubs and society 1810–1860 (The Bodley Head, 1964)
Ralph Nevill, The Man of Pleasure (Chatto & Windus, 1912)
Ralph Nevill, London Clubs – their history & treasures (Chatto & Windus, 1911)
Ralph Nevill, Romantic London (Cassell & Co., 1928)
Jane Ridley, The Young Disraeli 1804–1846 (Sinclair-Stevenson 1995)
"St James's : a satirical poem in six epistles to Mr Crockford" (London 1827)
E.J. Burford "Royal St James's – being a story of kings, clubmen and courtesans" (Robert Hale London 1988)
E. Beresford Chancellor "Memorials of St James's Street" (Grant Richards Ltd 1922)
Henry Blyth "Hell & Hazard – or William Crockford versus the Gentlemen of England"(Weidenfeld and Nicolson 1969)
Hunter Davies "The New London Spy" (Anthony Blond)
W. Teignmouth Shore "D'Orsay or the Complete Dandy" (John Long Ltd 1911)
Arthur Bryant "The Age of Elegance 1812–1822" (Collins 1950)
Stella Margetson "Leisure and Pleasure in the Nineteenth Century" (Cassell 1969)
Simon Dewes "Temple Bar Tapestry" (Rich & Cowan)
A.L.Humphreys "Crockford's or The Goddess of Chance in St James's Street 1828–1844" (Hutchinson 1953)
Michael Sadlier "Blessington-D'Orsay – A Masquerade" (Constable & Co Ltd 1933 & 1947)
"Bentley's Miscellany" Vol XV 1844
"Crockford-House, A Rhapsody in Two Cantos" (John Murray 1827)
Charles Evans "The Legend of the Crockford Treasure – a play for children" (Cressrelles Publishing)
Connery Chappell "Two Pleasures for Your Choosing – The World of William Crockford" (Falcon Press 1951)
T. H. S. Escott "The Romance of the West-End & Other Social Clubs" (T. Fisher Unwin 1914)
John o'London "London Stories" (Bracken Books 1985) Reprint of 1882 publication
Yves-Michel Ergal "Jeux d'Enfer" (Calmann-Levy 1992) An historical novel about William Crockford written in French
G.E.Mingay "Georgian London" (Batsford 1975)
David Piper "London" (Book Club 1964)
Harold Clunn "The Face of London" (Spring 1950s)
Gabriel Orozco "Empty Club" (Artangel 1996)
Tony Byles "In Search of Running Rein" (Apex 2011)
Nicholas Foulkes "Gentlemen and Blackguards" (Phoenix 2010)

Gentlemen's clubs in London
1793 establishments in England
Defunct clubs and societies of the United Kingdom
Defunct organisations based in London
Grade I listed buildings in the City of Westminster